Lower North Shore may refer to:
Lower North Shore (Sydney), a collection of suburbs of Sydney, New South Wales, Australia.
Basse-Côte-Nord, a previous equivalent territory in the Côte-Nord region of Quebec, Canada.

See also
North Shore (disambiguation)